St. Vitus's Church, or similar, may refer to:

 Church of St. Vitus (Chicago), Illinois, United States
 St. Vitus's Church, Cleveland, Ohio, United States
 St. Vitus Church (Český Krumlov), Czech Republic
 St. Vitus Cathedral, Prague, Czech Republic
 St. Vitus Cathedral in Rijeka, Croatia
 St. Vitus's Parish Church, Šentvid pri Planini, Šentjur, Slovenia
 Basilica of St. Vitus, Mönchengladbach, Germany
 St. Vitus' Abbey on the Rott, Neumarkt-Sankt Veit, Mühldorf, Bavaria, Germany.
 Protestant church of Wyns, Wyns, Netherlands